The 1998–99 Alpha Ethniki was the 63rd season of the highest football league of Greece. The season began on 22 August 1998 and ended on 30 May 1999. Olympiacos won their third consecutive and 28th Greek title.

Teams

Stadia and personnel

 1 On final match day of the season, played on 30 May 1999.

League table

Results

Top scorers

External links
Official Greek FA Site
RSSSF
Greek SuperLeague official Site
SuperLeague Statistics
 

Alpha Ethniki seasons
Greece
1